The 1st Siberian Army Corps was an elite unit of the Imperial Russian Army. It was raised in May 1900 and disbanded in August 1918.

History
The 1st Siberian Army Corps was raised in May 1900 under the command of Lieutenant General Nikolai Linevich and was one of the two most engaged Russian corps during the Russo-Japanese War. It took part in the battle of Telissu, the battle of Tashihchiao, the battle of Liaoyang, the battle of Sandepu and the battle of Mukden.

It also took part in World War I. Its last major action was at the Battle of Galați.

Organization

1904
1st Siberian Rifle Division (Lieutenant General Gerngross)
1st Brigade (Major General Rutowski)
1st Infantry Regiment (3 battalions)
2nd Infantry Regiment (3 battalions)
2nd Brigade (Major General Maximovich)
3rd Infantry Regiment (3 battalions)
4th Infantry Regiment (3 battalions)
1st East Siberian Rifle Artillery Brigade (Major General Lutshkovski)
4 Field Artillery Batteries (6 guns each)
9th Siberian Rifle Division (Major General Kondratovich)
1st Brigade (Major General Krause)
33rd Infantry Regiment (3 battalions)
34th Infantry Regiment (3 battalions)
2nd Brigade (Major General Sykow)
35th Infantry Regiment (3 battalions)
36th Infantry Regiment (3 battalions)
9th East Siberian Rifle Artillery Brigade (Major General Mrosovski)
4 Field Artillery Batteries (6 guns each)
1 Machinegun Company
Ussuri Cavalry Brigade
Frontier Guard Cavalry Regiment (4 Sotnias)
Frontier Guard Battery (4 Chinese Mountain Guns)
Primorsk Dragoon Regiment
2nd Transbaikal Cossack Battery
1st East Siberian Sapper Battalion

1914
1st Siberian Rifle Division
2nd Siberian Rifle Division
Ussuri Cavalry Brigade
1st Siberian Artillery Battalion
2nd Siberian Heavy Artillery Battalion
1st Siberian Ponton Battalion
1st Siberian Radio Battalion

List of Commanding officer

Notes

References

External links

Corps of the Russian Empire
Military units and formations established in 1900
Military units and formations disestablished in 1914